The Lambayeque Province is the largest of three provinces in Peru's Lambayeque Region.

Boundaries 
North, Northwest and West: Piura Region
Southeast Ferreñafe Province and Chiclayo Province
Southwest Pacific Ocean

Political Division 

Lambayeque
Chochope
Illimo
Jayanca
Mochumi
Morrope
Motupe
Olmos
Pacora
Salas
San José
Túcume

Population 
The province has an approximate population of 230,385 inhabitants.

Capital 
The provincial capital is Lambayeque.

See also 
Lambayeque Region
Peru

External links
  Official website of the Lambayeque Province

Provinces of the Lambayeque Region